"If We're in Love" is a song written and produced by Róisín Murphy and Matthew Herbert for Murphy's debut solo album, Ruby Blue (2005). It was released as the album's lead single in June 2005.

Music video
The music video for "If We're in Love" was directed by Simon Henwood. In the video, costumes and special effects are used to resemble a fairytale. The scenery, special effects, and costumes in the music video often remind viewers of Alice in Wonderland.

Formats and track listings
These are the formats and track listings of major single releases of "If We're in Love".

CD single
(Released )
"If We're in Love" (Radio edit)
"Ripples"

EP
(Released 13 June 2005)
"If We're in Love" (Radio edit)
"If We're in Love" (Matthew Herbert's Lovers remix)
"Ripples"
"If We're in Love" (Dani Siciliano's What Will Be Will Be mix)

Digital download
(Released 18 July 2005)
"If We're in Love" (Radio edit)
"If We're in Love" (Matthew Herbert's Lovers remix)
"Ripples"
"If We're in Love" (Dani Siciliano's What Will Be Will Be mix)

Charts

References

External links
 Official website

2005 singles
Róisín Murphy songs
Songs written by Róisín Murphy
Songs written by Matthew Herbert
2005 songs
The Echo Label singles
Nu jazz songs